Sabine Bohlmann (born 5 March 1969) is a German actress, perhaps most famous as the German voice of Lisa and Maggie Simpson on The Simpsons. She is most active in dubbing children's television. In the 1980s and 1990s, there was hardly any dubbed children's show, in which she was not to be heard at least as a "guest voice". Due to her very high and soft voice she is often used to dub young children and teenagers. Bohlmann also works as a writer, and has written six books.

Actress 
 Mit Leib und Seele (with belly and soul) (1989)
 Vera Wesskamp (1992)
 Happy Holiday (1994)
 Hotel Mama – Die Rückkehr der Kinder (Hotel mom – The return of the children) (1997)
 Our Charly (Unser Charly) (1999)
 Marienhof (1992–1997, 2000–2004)

German-language dubbing

Television series 
 Doctor Who
as Stellar in Dragonfire
as The Girl in Remembrance of the Daleks
as Little Girl in The Greatest Show in the Galaxy
as Jean in The Curse of Fenric
as Squeak in Survival.

Animation series 
Lisa Simpson and Maggie Simpson in The Simpsons
Baby Joe in Miss Moon
Cubby in Disney's Adventures of the Gummi Bears
Kenny McCormick, Ike Broflovski and Heidi Turner (season 9 - *) in South Park
Ling-Ling in Drawn Together
Honker Muddlefoot in Darkwing Duck
Nova in Silver Surfer
Rosie in Caillou
Isabella in Phineas and Ferb

Anime series 
Sailor Moon (season 1 (replaced by Inez Günther)), Diana, Parapara, and other minor roles in Sailor Moon
Pikachu (season 1) in Pokémon  (replaced by the original-voice Ikue Ōtani)
Lin-Lin and Lan-Lan in Ranma ½
Cream the Rabbit in Sonic X
Sailor Moon in Sailor Moon Crystal

Movies 
 Angela Goethals in Home Alone and Home Alone 2: Lost in New York
 Shirley Henderson in Harry Potter and the Chamber of Secrets and Harry Potter and the Goblet of Fire as Mouning Myrtle (in German: "Maulende Myrthe")
 Vanessa Paradis in Un amour de sorcière and Un amour de sorcièr
 Kenny McCormick & Ike Broflovski in South Park: Bigger, Longer & Uncut (1999)
 Lisa & Maggie Simpson in The Simpsons Movie (2007)
 Princess Lillifee and the Little Unicorn (2011)
 Ash's Pikachu (speaking role only) in Pokémon the Movie: I Choose You! (2017)
 Sailor Moon in Sailor Moon Eternal (2021)

References

External links 
 
 Sabine Bohlmann
 

1969 births
Living people
Actresses from Munich
German voice actresses